Volkert may refer to:

People
Edward Charles Volkert (1871–1935), American painter
Georg Volkert (1945–2020), German footballer
Stephan Volkert (born 1971), German rower
Volkert Doeksen (born 1963), Dutch money manager
Volkert van der Graaf (born 1969), Dutch assassin
Volkert Kraeft (born 1941), German actor
Volkert Merl (born 1940), German racing driver
Volkert Overlander (1570–1630), Dutch noble, jurist, ship-owner and merchant
Volkert Simon Maarten van der Willigen (1822–1878), Dutch mathematician and physicist

Companies
Volkert, Inc., a consulting firm headquartered in Mobile, Alabama

Buildings
Volkert Van Buren House, historic home in Oswego County, New York
Surnames from given names